The 1992 NAIA World Series was the 36th annual tournament hosted by the National Association of Intercollegiate Athletics to determine the national champion of baseball among its member colleges and universities in the United States and Canada.

After eight seasons in Lewiston, Idaho, this tournament was played at Sec Taylor Stadium in Des Moines, Iowa.

Five-time defending champions Lewis–Clark State (55–10) defeated Mary Hardin–Baylor (40–18) in a single-game championship series, 14–4, to win the Warriors' eighth NAIA World Series. This would go on to be the sixth of six consecutive World Series championships for the program.

Mary Hardin–Baylor outfielder Mike Meggers was named tournament MVP.

Bracket

Preliminary

Championship

See also
 1992 NCAA Division I baseball tournament
 1992 NCAA Division II baseball tournament
 1992 NCAA Division III baseball tournament
 1992 NAIA Softball World Series

Reference

|NAIA World Series
NAIA World Series
NAIA World Series
NAIA World Series